The 2018–19 season was FCSB's 71st season since its founding in 1947.

Previous season positions

Players

First team squad

Transfers

In

Out

Overall transfer activity

Expenditure
Summer:   €1,800,000

Winter:   €150,000

Total:    €1,950,000

Income
Summer:   €4,575,000

Winter:   €225,000

Total:    €4,800,000

Net Totals
Summer:   €2,775,000

Winter:   €75,000

Total:    €2,850,000

Friendly matches

Competitions

Overview

Liga I

Regular season

Table

Results summary

Position by round

Results

Championship round

Table

Results summary

Position by round

Matches

Cupa României

Results

UEFA Europa League

Qualifying rounds

Second qualifying round

Third qualifying round

Play-off round

Statistics

Appearances and goals

! colspan="13" style="background:#DCDCDC; text-align:center" | Players from FCSB II
|-

! colspan="13" style="background:#DCDCDC; text-align:center" | Players transferred out during the season
|-

|}

Squad statistics
{|class="wikitable" style="text-align: center;"
|-
! 
! style="width:70px;"|Liga I
! style="width:70px;"|Cupa României
! style="width:70px;"|Europa League
! style="width:70px;"|Home
! style="width:70px;"|Away
! style="width:70px;"|Total Stats
|-
|align=left|Games played       || 36 || 2 || 6 || 21 || 23 || 44
|-
|align=left|Games won          || 21 || 1 || 4 || 15 || 11 || 26
|-
|align=left|Games drawn        || 9 || 0 || 1 || 2 || 8 || 10
|-
|align=left|Games lost         || 6 || 1 || 1 || 3 || 5 || 8 
|-
|align=left|Goals scored       || 67 || 2 || 11 || 39 || 41 || 80
|-
|align=left|Goals conceded     || 35 || 2 || 5 || 16 || 26 || 42
|-
|align=left|Goal difference    || +32 || 0 || +6 || +23 || +15 || +38
|-
|align=left|Clean sheets       || 13 || 1 || 3 || 10 || 7 || 17
|-
|align=left|Goal by Substitute || 14 || 1 || 1 || 8 || 8 || 16
|-
|align=left|Total shots        || 364|| 0 || 55 || 221 || 198 || 419
|-
|align=left|Shots on target    || 183|| 0 || 31 || 115 || 99 || 214
|-
|align=left|Corners            || 202 || 0 || 28 || 121 || 109 || 230
|-
|align=left|Players used       || 28 || 20 || 23 || 27 || 34 || 34
|-
|align=left|Offsides           || 74 || 0 || 14 || 44 || 44 || 88
|-
|align=left|Fouls suffered     || 582 || 0 || 104 || 314 || 372 || 686
|-
|align=left|Fouls committed    || 562 || 0 || 87 || 289 || 360 || 649
|-
|align=left|Yellow cards       || 93 || 5 || 22 || 53 || 67 || 120
|-
|align=left|Red cards          || 8 || 1 || 1 || 4 || 6 || 10
|-
|align=left| Winning rate      || % || % || % || %  || % || %
|-

Goalscorers

Goal minutes

Last updated: 19 May 2019 (UTC) 
Source: FCSB

Hat-tricks

Clean sheets

Disciplinary record

Attendances

Awards

Liga I Foreign Player of the Year

Liga I team of the regular season

Liga I team of the championship round

Liga I team of the season

UEFA Club rankings
This is the current UEFA Club Rankings, including season 2017–18.

See also

 2018–19 Cupa României
 2018–19 Liga I
 2018–19 UEFA Europa League

Notes and references

FC Steaua București seasons
Steaua
Steaua București